Gopsall is a former civil parish, now in the parish of Twycross, in the Hinckley and Bosworth district, in the county of Leicestershire, England. It is located between the villages of Appleby Magna, Shackerstone, Twycross and Snarestone. In 1931 the parish had a population of 13. Gopsall was formerly an extra-parochial tract, from 1858 Gopsall was a civil parish in its own right, on 1 April 1935 the parish was abolished and merged with Twycross.

The name 'Gopsall' means 'hill of the servants'.

Gopsall is the site of a former Georgian country house that was known as Gopsall Hall. The northern edge of the estate is dissected by the Ashby-de-la-Zouch Canal and a long distance trail known as the Ivanhoe Way.

The area is mostly agricultural and is dotted with privately rented farms. A permissive footpath allows limited access to the public between Little Twycross and Shackerstone. The A444 Ashby to Nuneaton road also leads to a canal wharf on the western edge of the estate.

Gopsall Hall
Gopsall Hall was erected for Charles Jennens around 1750 at a cost of £100,000 (£8,516,000 today). It was long believed to have been designed by John Westley and built by the Hiorns of Warwick, who later added service wings and Rococo interiors. However, later research by John Harris, curator of the RIBA drawings collection suggests that it was designed as well as built by William or David Hiorns.

The Hall was set in several hundred acres of land and included two lakes, a walled garden, a Chinese boathouse, a Gothic seat and various garden buildings. In 1818 a grand entrance (modelled on the Arch of Constantine) was added.

Queen Adelaide was a frequent visitor to the Hall during her long widowhood. She was popular with the locals, being remembered in many of the surrounding villages. (E.g. The former Queen Adelaide Pub in Appleby Magna, Queen Street, Measham and the Queen Adelaide Oak Tree in Bradgate Park)

In 1848 Gopsall Hall was described as follows:

Said to be the finest country house in Leicestershire, its last use was as an army headquarters during World War II, and was in such bad repair that it was demolished in 1951. Gopsall Park Farm was built over most of the original site and is not accessible without invitation.

The remains include parts of the walled garden, the electricity generating building, an underground reservoir, the tree-lined avenue, the gatehouse and the temple ruins associated with Handel.

During the 1920s and 1930s Gopsall hosted a motor racing circuit and part of the woodland is still named "The Race Course".

Notable guests who stayed at the estate included Queen Adelaide, King Edward VII, Queen Alexandra, and Winston Churchill.

Land around Gopsall was considered as a possible site for East Midlands Airport.

Between 1873 and the 1930s Gopsall was served via the Ashby to Nuneaton railway line.  The station at Shackerstone is part of a preserved railway and visitor attraction (Battlefield Line Railway).

There was a Great Western Railway steam locomotive by the name of "Gopsal Hall". Note the misspelling of the name.

Chronology of owners
 pre 1750:  Humphrey Jennens
 circa 1750 - 1773:  Charles Jennens, grandson of Humphrey Jennens
 circa 1773 - 1797:  Penn Assheton Curzon, son of Assheton Curzon, 1st Viscount Curzon, and also a cousin of Charles Jennens 
 1797 - 1870:  Richard Curzon-Howe (Earl Howe), son of Penn Assheton Curzon and Sophia Howe (Baroness Howe)
 1870 - 1919:  the Curzon-Howe family
 1919 – 1927:  Sir Samuel James Waring (Lord Waring), of Waring & Gillow.
 1927 – 1932:  Crown Estate (Gopsall estate only)
 1932 – present:  Crown Estate (Gopsall estate and Hall) (NOTE: Hall demolished circa 1952)
 1942 – 1945:  the Royal Electrical and Mechanical Engineers (REME) made use of the Hall as an experimental radar base during the Second World War.

Gopsall Temple
In 2002 the temple was part of a restoration project and it is also a Grade II listed building.

It is possible to visit the monument via the public footpath near the old Gopsall Hall Gatehouse entrance in the village of Shackerstone. It is a good 15 minute walk to the site.

A statue of Religion by Louis Francois Roubiliac stood on the roof of the temple and was erected as a memorial to the classical scholar (and Jennens’s friend) Edward Holdsworth. The figure was donated by Lord Howe to the City of Leicester and is housed in the gardens of Belgrave Hall Museum.

Handel’s Messiah
During the second half of the eighteenth century the estate was owned by Charles Jennens (a librettist and friend of George Frideric Handel). It is reputed that in 1741 Handel composed part of Messiah, his famous oratorio, inside a garden temple at Gopsall. Some texts however challenge this theory and posit there is no evidence to confirm Handel stayed on the estate in 1741, although he was a frequent visitor. The temple was built after Messiah had already been completed.

The organ that Handel specified for Charles Jennens in 1749 is now to be found in St James' Church, Great Packington.

Notes

References
 Census output area 31UEGL0005 covers most of the area around Gopsall Park.  For further details visit Neighbourhood Statistics website 
 The Musical Times and Singing Class Circular, Vol. 43, No. 717 (November 1, 1902), pp. 713–718 website link
 Lewis, Samuel (Eds), A Topographical Dictionary of England., (7th Edition, 1848). British History website
 Details of Crown Estate ownership can be found on The Crown Estate website
 Details of old money conversion can be found at The National Archives - Currency converter: 1270–2017

Further reading
 Oakley, Glynis.  A History of Gopsall. (Bancroft printing, 1997)
 Smith, Ruth 'The Achievements of Charles Jennens (1700–1773)', Music & Letters, Vol. 70, No. 2 (May, 1989), pp. 161–190
 Lewis, Samuel (Eds), A Topographical Dictionary of England, 1848 (7th Edition), 'Goodneston - Gosforth', pp. 315–19.

External links
Gopsall Hall history and photos
Handel House Museum website
Letter from Handel to Charles Jennens regarding the organ for Gopsall
The Gopsall Organ
The tune from the Messiah by Handel "Gopsal" (Rejoice, the Lord is King!)
Pictures of Gopsall
Gopsall Fishing Club

Former civil parishes in Leicestershire
Ruins in Leicestershire
Geography of Leicestershire
Tourist attractions in Leicestershire
Grade II listed buildings in Leicestershire
Crown Estate
Twycross